Konkola Mine Police is a Zambian football club based in Chililabombwe that plays in the MTN/FAZ Super Division. The team plays its home games at Konkola Stadium in Chililabombwe.

External links

 Club logo

Football clubs in Zambia
Police association football clubs
Mining association football teams